The Battle of Tanga, sometimes also known as the Battle of the Bees, was the unsuccessful attack by the British Indian Expeditionary Force "B" under Major General A. E. Aitken to capture German East Africa (the mainland portion of present-day Tanzania) during the First World War in concert with the invasion Force "C" near Longido on the slopes of Mount Kilimanjaro. It was the first major event of the war in Eastern Africa and saw the British defeated by a significantly smaller force of German Askaris and colonial volunteers under Lieutenant Colonel Paul von Lettow-Vorbeck. 
It was the beginning of the East African Campaign of World War I, and is considered one of greatest victories of the Schutztruppe in Africa.
The British retreat enabled the Schutztruppe to salvage modern equipment, medical supplies, tents, blankets, food and a number of Maxim machine guns which allowed them to successfully resist the allies for the rest of the war.

Prelude

Tanga, situated only  from the border of British East Africa (modern-day Kenya), was a busy port and the ocean terminal of the important Usambara Railway, which ran from Tanga to Neu Moshi at the foot of Mount Kilimanjaro. Tanga was initially to be bombarded by British warships, but this part of the plan was scrapped. An agreement was in place guaranteeing the neutrality of the capital Dar es Salaam and Tanga, but now the accord was modified and it seemed "only fair to warn the Germans that the deal was off."

Instead, the British resolve to capture German East Africa was to be implemented with an amphibious attack on Tanga. Unlike the plan on paper, however, the attack turned into a debacle. On 2 November 1914, the British protected cruiser  arrived. The ship's commander, Captain Francis Wade Caulfeild, went ashore giving Tanga one hour to surrender and take down the imperial flag. Before departing, he demanded to know if the harbor was mined; it was not, but he was assured that it was. After three hours, the flag was still flying and Fox departed to bring in the Force "B" convoy of fourteen troop transports. This gave time for both the Schutztruppe and the citizens of Tanga to prepare for an attack. The German commander, Lieutenant Colonel Paul Emil von Lettow-Vorbeck, rushed to Tanga. He reinforced the defences (initially only a single company of Askaris) with troops brought in by rail from Neu Moshi, eventually numbering about 1,000 in six companies. His second-in-command was former German East Africa Company Captain Tom von Prince.

Battle

Captain Caulfeild ordered the harbor swept for mines during 2 November and well into the next day. During the sweeping, the Force "B" commander, Aitken, began the unopposed landing of troops and supplies in two groups at the harbor and three miles east of the city on a mine-free beach. By evening on 3 November, the invasion force was ashore with the exception of the 27th Mountain Battery and the Faridkot Sappers. At noon on 4 November, Aitken ordered his troops to march on the city. Well concealed defenders quickly broke up their advance. The fighting then turned to skirmishing amidst the coconut and palm oil plantations by the southern contingent and bitter street-fighting by the harbor force. The Gurkhas of the Kashmiri Rifles and the 2nd Loyal North Lancashire Regiment of the harbour contingent made good progress; they entered the town, captured the customs house, and Hotel Deutscher Kaiser and ran up the Union Jack.  But then the advance was stopped. Less-well trained and equipped Indian battalions of Wapshare's 27th (Bangalore) Brigade scattered and ran away from the battle. The 98th Infantry were attacked by swarms of angry bees and broke up. The bees attacked the Germans as well, hence the battle's nickname. British propaganda transformed the bee interlude into a fiendish German plot, conjuring up hidden trip wires to agitate the hives. The 13th Rajputs failed to play a significant role in the battle as their morale had been shaken when witnessing the retreat of the 63rd Palamcottah Light Infantry.

The colonial volunteers of the 7th and 8th Schützenkompanien [rifle companies] arrived by rail to stiffen the pressed Askari lines. The normally mounted 8th Schützenkompanie had left their horses at Neu Moshi. By late afternoon on 4 November, Lettow-Vorbeck ordered his last reserves, the 13th and 4th Askari Feldkompanien (field companies) – the 4th had just reached Tanga by train), to envelop the British flank and rear by launching bayonet attacks along the entire front to "bugle calls and piercing tribal war cries." At least three battalions of the Imperial Service Brigade would have been wiped out to a man, if they had not taken to their heels. All semblance of order vanished as Force B's retirement "degenerated into total rout."

Still outnumbered eight to one, caution overtook some of the German officers. Through a series of errors by the buglers and misunderstandings by an officer to disengage and consolidate, the Askari withdrew to a camp several miles west of Tanga. As soon as Lettow-Vorbeck learned of this, he countermanded the move and ordered a redeployment that was not completed until early morning. "For nearly all of the night [before sunrise 5 November], Tanga was Aitken's for the taking. It was the most stupendous irony of the battle."

Aftermath
Furious and frustrated, Aitken ordered a general withdrawal. In their retreat and evacuation back to the transports that lasted well into the night, the British troops left behind nearly all their equipment. "Lettow-Vorbeck was able to re-arm three Askari companies with modern rifles, for which he now had 600,000 rounds of ammunition. He also had sixteen more machine guns, valuable field telephones" and enough clothing to last the Schutztruppe for a year. On the morning of 5 November, Force B's intelligence officer—Captain Richard Meinertzhagen—entered Tanga under a white flag, bringing medical supplies and carrying a letter from General Aitken apologizing for shelling the hospital. The streets of Tanga were strewn with dead and wounded. German doctors and their African orderlies worked tirelessly and "with a fine disregard for their patients' uniforms."

The successful defence of Tanga was the first of many achievements of Paul von Lettow-Vorbeck during his long campaign in East Africa. For the British, however, the battle was nothing short of a disaster, and was recorded in the British Official History of the War as "one of the most notable failures in British military history." Casualties included 360 killed and 487 wounded on the British side; the Schutztruppe lost 16 Germans and 55 Askaris killed, and 76 total wounded.

Paul von Lettow-Vorbeck initially estimated the number of British killed at 800 but later said that he believed the number was more likely over 2,000. The Germans subsequently released the British officers who had been wounded or captured after they gave their word not to fight again during the war.

See also
 East African campaign (World War I)
 Battle of Kilimanjaro

Notes

References

Farwell, Byron. The Great War in Africa, 1914–1918. New York: W. W. Norton & Company, 1989. .
Hoyt, Edwin P. Guerilla: Colonel von Lettow-Vorbeck and Germany's East African Empire. New York: Macmillan Publishing Co., Inc. 1981; and London: Collier Macmillan Publishers. 1981. .
Miller, Charles. Battle for the Bundu: The First World War in German East Africa. London: Macdonald & Jane's, 1974; and New York: Macmillan Publishing Co., Inc. 1974. .
Paice, Edward. Tip and Run: The Untold Tragedy of the Great War in Africa. London: Weidenfeld & Nicolson, 2007. .
von Lettow-Vorbeck, Paul. My reminiscences of East Africa. London: Hurst, 1920

Further reading

 Anderson, Ross. 2001. "The Battle of Tanga, 2–5 November 1914". War in History. 8, no. 3: 294–322.
 Anderson, Ross. The Battle of Tanga 1914. Stroud, Gloucestershire: Tempus, 2002.  
 Harvey, Kenneth J. The Battle of Tanga, German East Africa 1914. [Washington, DC]: Storming Media, 2003. 
 Page, Melvin E. (Melvin Eugene). 2003. "The Battle of Tanga 1914 (Review)". Journal of Military History. 67, no. 4: 1307–1308.

External links

 Francis W. Caulfeild at The Dreadnought Project

Conflicts in 1914
1914 in German East Africa
Battles of the East African Campaign
Battles of World War I involving the United Kingdom
Battles of World War I involving British India
Battles of World War I involving Germany
History of Kenya
Tanga, Tanzania
Battles of World War I involving Indian Princely States
November 1914 events
Amphibious operations involving the United Kingdom